Naomi Broady and Kristýna Plíšková were the defending champions, but both players chose to participate in Rome and Trnava instead, respectively. 

Indy de Vroome and Aleksandrina Naydenova won the title, defeating Nigina Abduraimova and Ksenia Lykina in the final, 6–4, 6–1.

Seeds

Draw

References 
 Draw

Fukuoka International Women's Cup - Doubles
Fukuoka International Women's Cup